Angela Pan Yin-tze (born 5 June 1949), or Violet Pan Ying Zi, is a Hong Kong actress who starred in numerous films and soap operas in the 1970s–1980s.

Life and career 

Pan started her career in Hong Kong in films and stage shows. She became a celebrity when she went to Taiwan and became the lead actress in The Return of the Condor Heroes (神鵰俠侶), The Empress of the Dynasty (一代女皇), and The Princess of the Dynasty (一代公主). At the time, the Taiwan Television Circle stated Pan and her costar Meng Fei (孟飛) were the "perfect couple on the screen." The shows were viewed by over 60% of the population. 

Pan concluded her work with the Southern Experimental Theater Troupe and began working as an actress in shows through Taiwan's well-known television network China Television Company, Ltd., also known as CTV (中國電視公司). At the time, there were only three channels in Taiwan: Taiwan Television (TTV), China Television (CTV), and Chinese Television System (CTS). This led her to be dubbed the "Lovely Young Mistress of CTV (中視當家花旦)" and the "Queen of CTV" due to all of her television appearances being on CTV during the golden age of the 1980s and 90s.

Even though Pan started in the 1960s, she never revealed her actual age, and people have been unable to guess her age because of the range of ages she has played as an actress. In The Empress of the Dynasty and "Empress Da Yu Er" (一代皇后大玉兒), Pan was critically acclaimed for playing characters from childhood to old age. She was given the nickname "Baby Doll" or "Doll" (娃娃) or "Ageless Legend" because of her ability to play teenage girl roles over the years. She was also the first actress rumored to have cosmetic work and is considered the Goldie Hawn of Asia due to the similarity of her ageless look.

Pan is also well known in China because of her shows of The Empress of the Dynasty, The Return of the Condor Heroes, Empress Da Yu Er and The Quarrels with Mother-in-Law, among other roles.

Personal life
In 1972, Pan married actor Chan Hung-lit, whom she co-starred with in many films. They divorced in 1980.

Filmography

Film

Television

References

External links 
 Angela Pan fansite
 Angela Pan filmography on Yesasia
 

Actresses from Suzhou
1945 births
Living people
Hong Kong film actresses
Taiwanese film actresses
Taiwanese female models
Taiwanese television actresses
Hong Kong television actresses